The 2020 Toyota 200 was a NASCAR Xfinity Series race held on May 21, 2020—postponed from May 19, 2020 due to weather—at Darlington Raceway in Darlington, South Carolina. The race replaced the Chicagoland 300 for the 2020 season. Contested over 147 laps on the  egg-shaped oval, it was the fifth race of the 2020 NASCAR Xfinity Series season. Chase Briscoe took home his second victory of the season in NASCAR's return from the COVID-19 pandemic.

Report

Background 
The Toyota 200 marked the Xfinity Series' return to racing following a 10-week break caused by the COVID-19 pandemic, which began with the postponement of the Atlanta race weekend on March 13 and continued through mid-May.

On April 30, NASCAR announced their return to racing with two Cup Series races and an Xfinity Series race at Darlington, with Cup races held Sunday, May 17 and Wednesday, May 20 and the Xfinity Series race held Tuesday, May 19 (later postponed to May 21 due to weather). Due to the pandemic, the race was held without fans in attendance.

This was the first Xfinity Series race held at Darlington in the spring since 2014, and the first Darlington race branded the Toyota 200 since 2004.

Entry list 

 (R) denotes rookie driver.
 (i) denotes driver who is ineligible for series driver points.

Qualifying 
Under modified operational procedures, no qualifying sessions were held for this race. The starting order was determined by a random draw, with drivers grouped into pots of positions based on segments of the owners' points standings going into the race. Additionally, NASCAR announced they were expanding the field of Xfinity Series entries from 36 to 40 due to the lack of qualifying.

Starting Lineup

Race

Race results

Stage Results 
Stage One

Laps: 45

Stage Two

Laps: 45

Final Stage Results 

Laps: 57

Race statistics 

 Lead changes: 10 among 6 different drivers
 Cautions/Laps: 5 for 28
 Red flags: 0
 Time of race: 1 hour, 44 minutes, 26 seconds
 Average speed:

Media

Television 
The Toyota 200 was carried by FS1 in the United States. Adam Alexander, Stewart-Haas Racing driver Clint Bowyer, and Michael Waltrip called the race from the Fox Sports Studio in Charlotte, with Regan Smith covering pit road.

Radio 
The Motor Racing Network (MRN) called the race for radio, which was simulcast on SiriusXM NASCAR Radio. Alex Hayden and Dave Moody anchored the action from the booth. Dillon Welch called the action from Turns 1 & 2 and Steve Post called the race through turns 3 & 4. Kim Coon and Hannah Newhouse provided reports from pit road.

Standings after the race 

 Drivers' Championship standings

Note: Only the first 12 positions are included for the driver standings.

References 

2020 NASCAR Xfinity Series
Toyota 200
2020 in sports in South Carolina
NASCAR races at Darlington Raceway
Toyota